Nathan Roebuck (born 2 October 1999) is a professional rugby league footballer who plays as a er or  for the Keighley Cougars in RFL League 1.

Background
Roebuck played his amateur rugby league with the Saddleworth Rangers.

Career

Warrington Wolves
Roebuck made his Super League debut in round 14 of the 2020 Super League season for Warrington against the Salford Red Devils and went on to score a try in the 18th minute.

Leigh Centurions (loan)
On 17 March 2021, it was reported that he had joined the Leigh Centurions in the Super League on loan.

Salford Red Devils (loan)
On 8 July 2021, it was reported that he had signed for Salford in the Super League on loan for the remainder of the 2021 season.

Keighley Cougars
On 19 November 2021, it was reported that he had signed for Keighley in the RFL League 1.

References

External links
Warrington profile

1999 births
Living people
English rugby league players
Keighley Cougars players
Leigh Leopards players
Rugby league wingers
Rugby league centres
Rugby league players from Greater Manchester
Salford Red Devils players
Warrington Wolves players